Mathew Hole, D.D. was an Oxford college head in the 18th century.

Hole was educated at Exeter College, Oxford and was appointed a Fellow in 1663. He was Rector from 1715 until his death on 19 July 1730. An ordained Anglican priest, he held livings at Bishop's Lavington, Stogursey and Fiddington.

References

Alumni of Exeter College, Oxford
Rectors of Exeter College, Oxford
Fellows of Exeter College, Oxford
1730 deaths
17th-century English Anglican priests
18th-century English Anglican priests